A Father for Charlie (alternate title: High Lonesome), is a television film that premiered on CBS on January 1, 1995. The film was directed by Jeff Bleckner and written by H. Haden Yelin. It stars Louis Gossett Jr. as Walter Osgood, the only black farmer in the highly-prejudiced town of High Lonesome in the Ozarks, at the height of the Great Depression in 1932. Despite the racist abuse he endures from the townspeople and the Ku Klux Klan, Walter forms an unlikely friendship with Charlie, the 10-year-old son of his white tenant farmer.

Cast
 Louis Gossett Jr. as Walter Osgood
 Joseph Mazzello as Charlie
 James Greene as Sam
 Don Swayze as Reuben Cantwell
 David Hart as Woodrow
 William Lucking as Argus
 Jack Kehler
 Mark Cabus
 Patrick Labyorteaux as the Postmaster
 William Fichtner as the Sheriff
 Evan Rachel Wood as Tessa

Production
A Father for Charlie was filmed in Southern California.

Critical reception
Marion Garmel of The Indianapolis Star gave the film a favorable review, writing that it has "a wonderful spunkiness that makes you cheer for the human spirit." Also giving the film a positive review in the Los Angeles Times, Ray Loynd praised Yelin's writing for "turn[ing] material that appears to be dangerously fraught with sentiment and giv[ing] it thrust and life." Varietys Alan Rich found the film highly unoriginal, but noted that "[t]he very predictability lends the viewers a comforting caress." John Voorhees of The Seattle Times praised Gossett Jr.'s performance which he felt made the film worth watching. Chicago Tribunes Sid Smith thought the portrayal of racism was "heavy-handed," but found the film "ultimately irresistible."

Ratings
A Father for Charlie earned a 14.8 national Nielsen rating, equalling 14.1 million households, making it the eighth highest-rated prime time program for the week of December 26, 1994 to January 1, 1995. In terms of total viewers, the film was the sixth most-watched prime time program with an audience of 22.9 million.

References

External links
 

1995 television films
CBS network films
Films about racism in the United States
Films about the Ku Klux Klan
Great Depression films
Films set in 1932
Films shot in California
Films directed by Jeff Bleckner
Films scored by David Shire
Films set in the Ozarks